Dentistyla sericifilum is a species of sea snail, a marine gastropod mollusk in the family Chilodontidae.

Description
The height of the shell attains 9 mm. The shell is delicately but sharply reticulate all over. The two peripheral spirals are minutely spinose at the intersections. The columellar tooth is present but not strong. The shell is thinner and more nacreous than the typical form, and with the radiating and spiral sculpture not differing so much in strength.

Distribution
This marine species occurs in the Caribbean Sea off the Grenadines and Barbados

References

External links
 To Encyclopedia of Life
 To World Register of Marine Species

sericifilum
Gastropods described in 1889